Georg Utz (born 22 August 1935) is a German former wrestler. He competed in the men's freestyle middleweight at the 1960 Summer Olympics.

References

External links
 

1935 births
Living people
People from Ludwigsburg (district)
Sportspeople from Stuttgart (region)
People from the Free People's State of Württemberg
German male sport wrestlers
Olympic wrestlers of the United Team of Germany
Wrestlers at the 1960 Summer Olympics